Rachel Rice (born 7 March 1984) is a Welsh television personality, model, actress and teacher. She is known for winning the ninth series of the Channel 4 reality series Big Brother. She has a degree in English and Drama, and is now a teacher at Abersychan School.

Career

Early life and career 
Born in Pontypool, Rice worked as a television and film actress. She took part in numerous global television commercials – including the Sony Handicam's 'Fairies at the Bottom of the Garden' in 1991. One of her most notable roles was an appearance alongside Hugh Grant in the 1993 Gothic horror Night Train to Venice when she was eight. She later worked as a model and trained as a teacher. She is currently teaching full-time.

Big Brother
Rice entered the Big Brother house on 5 June 2008. During her stay in the house, Rice survived two eviction votes, the first in Week 8, where nine others faced eviction as a punishment for breaking rules, and the second in Week 10, where she survived over Stuart Pilkington. She was announced as the winner of her series on 5 September 2008.

On the Big Brother's Little Brother reunion show, Rice spoke of her plans to spend some of her £100,000 prize money on paying student debts, buying a new car and giving £10,000 to charity.

On 4 January 2009, Rice appeared on The Sunday Night Project taking part in the Coat of Cash feature.

On 6 June 2009, Rice appeared on T4, where she discussed her first impressions on the Big Brother 10 housemates, and what she had done with her £100,000 winners prize since leaving the house.

Modelling
Rice was second runner up in the 2003 Miss Wales contest, which was won by Imogen Thomas; who coincidentally appeared in series seven of Big Brother. She has gone on to represent both South and North Wales in Miss Great Britain. In 2004, she won the Wales On Sunday newspaper's Welsh Idol. Rice was also a finalist in the 2005 More magazine's Most fanciable girl in the UK beauty contest.

Filmography

References

External links
 
 

1984 births
Living people
Big Brother (British TV series) winners
People educated at Caerleon Comprehensive School
People from Cwmbran
Welsh people of Irish descent
Welsh female models
Welsh film actresses
Welsh television actresses